Jacob Lines may refer to: 
Jacob Lines, a neighbourhood of Jamshed Town, Pakistan
Jakob Lines, a defunct Finnish ferry operator